Retro is a compilation album by American rock musician Lou Reed, released on March 12, 1989 in the United Kingdom by RCA Records.

Track listing
 "I Love You, Suzanne" 
 "Wild Child" 
 "How Do You Think It Feels" 
 "Lady Day" 
 "Coney Island Baby" 
 "Sweet Jane" (live) 
 "Vicious" 
 "Sally Can't Dance" 
 "Berlin" 
 "Caroline Says II" 
 "Perfect Day" 
 "Kill Your Sons" 
 "White Light/White Heat" (live) 
 "I'm Waiting for the Man"  (The Velvet Underground)
 "Heroin"  (The Velvet Underground)
 "Walk on the Wild Side"
 "Satellite of Love"

Certifications

References

Lou Reed compilation albums
1989 compilation albums
RCA Records compilation albums